FX Fighter is a series of video games developed by Argonaut Games and published by GTE Entertainment. The two games in the series are FX Fighter (1995) for DOS CD-ROM and FX Fighter Turbo (1996) for Windows 95.

FX Fighter

The first game in the series was published by GTE Entertainment on June 24, 1995. It is an early realtime 3D fighting game for MS-DOS CD-ROM PC. OEM versions of this title have support for 3D acceleration, bundled with 3D graphics accelerator cards such as the Diamond Monster 3D.

The game features 8 different characters, 8 different arenas, movie cutscenes, and 40 attacks per fighter. The player selects a character to face against 8 of the best fighters in the universe, with the prize being the most powerful weapon in the universe.

Character roster

Magnon
Lava dwelling silicone based lifeform. Very strong and breathes fire.

Age: Unknown

Home world: Inferno - A primeval volcanic wasteland.

Height: 6'6Weight: 300 lb

Sex: Unknown

Job: Unknown

Sheba
Home world: Rhomb - A world of vast savannahs ruled by the highly respected feran monarchy.

Venam
Home world: Peres - A planet dominated by tropical forests and caves.

Jake
Home world: Sentral - Massively overpopulated and polluted industrialized world.

Kiko
Home world: Lusk - Mountainous planet with low technology but a developed culture.

Siren
Home world: Ursae - A water world completely covered by a single ocean.

Ashraf
Home world: Karlak - Temperate planet with an ancient culture.

Cyben
Home world: Axone - A world rich in mineral deposits but with no atmosphere.

Rygil
Home world: Anarchis - A high gravity world owned by the cadre.

Super NES
A version for the Super Nintendo Entertainment System was previewed in GamePro and Nintendo Power and relies on the Super FX powered GSU-2 (or "Super FX 2") chip to deliver polygon graphics that are otherwise unattainable on the SNES. At the Winter 1995 Consumer Electronics Show, GTE Entertainment and Nintendo announced that they would be jointly developing and publishing the game. However, after Nintendo decided to port Killer Instinct to the SNES, the SNES version of FX Fighter was canceled to avoid competition between the two games.

Reception

For the launch of FX Fighter, GTE Entertainment shipped 200,000 units of the game to stores and dedicated more than $2 million to its promotional campaign.Entertainment Weekly gave the PC version of the game an A- and wrote that the game was as good as any that was offered on home consoles, but remarked that playing games on a television screen was better than a computer screen.Next Generation reviewed the PC version of the game, rating it four stars out of five, and stated that "Even without the spectacular visuals, FX Fighter would be better than Mortal Kombat II - and that's saying a lot."

Frank Snyder of Computer Game Review was largely positive toward the game, calling it "definitely worth checking out".

In other media
A comic based on the video game was created by Jim Lee of Wildstorm Productions, which was hosted by GTE Interactive Media's web site.

FX Fighter TurboFX Fighter Turbo is a sequel that was released for the PC in 1996 with new characters, moves, environments, costumes, special effects, network play, and support for Microsoft Windows and the S3 Graphics chipset. As are many other fighting games at the time, this game is influenced by Mortal Kombat'' in the form of fatalities, a feature not seen in the previous game.

Character roster
All the previous characters return with two others joining the party: Linna and Kwondo.

See also
List of fighting games

References

External links
Argonaut Games pages: FXF, FXFT
GTE Vantage Incorporated pages: FXF, FXFT

1995 video games
1996 video games
3D fighting games
Argonaut Games games
Blazing Renderer games
Cancelled Super Nintendo Entertainment System games
DOS games
DOS-only games
Super FX games
Fighting games
Video games developed in the United Kingdom
Video games set on fictional planets